Aliaksandra Sasnovich was the defending champion, but she lost in the first round to Andrea Hlaváčková.

Kateřina Siniaková won the title, defeating Ons Jabeur in the final, 7–5, 6–2.

Seeds

Main draw

Finals

Top half

Bottom half

References 
 Main draw

Open GDF Suez Nantes Atlantique - Singles